The Walker Brothers were an American pop group of the 1960s and 1970s which included Noel Scott Engel (eventually known professionally as Scott Walker), John Walker (born John Joseph Maus, but using the name Walker since his teens) and Gary Leeds (eventually known as Gary Walker). After moving to Britain in 1965, they had a number of top-10 albums and singles there, including the No. 1 hits "Make It Easy on Yourself" and "The Sun Ain't Gonna Shine (Anymore)", both of which also made the US top 20 and Canadian top 2. Between the two was the lesser US hit "My Ship is Coming In", another major hit in Britain, where it reached No. 3 in the chart. The trio split up in 1968, but reunited in the mid- to late 1970s and scored a final top-10 UK hit with "No Regrets".

Formed in 1964, they adopted the 'Walker Brothers' name as a show business touch even though the members were all unrelated — "simply because we liked it." They provided a unique counterpoint to the British Invasion by achieving much more success in the United Kingdom than in their home country, a period when the popularity of British bands such as The Beatles dominated the U.S. charts.

History

Formation
The Walker Brothers Trio was formed in Los Angeles in 1964 by John Walker (lead vocals, guitar), Scott Engel (bass, harmony vocals), and drummer Al "Tiny" Schneider.  Before then, John Walker—who had already been using that name professionally for several years—had performed and recorded several unsuccessful singles with his sister as a duo, John and Judy, and Engel had been bass player with instrumental band The Routers.  Walker and Engel, with two other musicians, had also toured the Midwest in 1963 as The Surfaris, though the group included none of the musicians who played on the Surfaris' records.  Dropping the word Trio, Walker and Engel were signed by Mercury Records, recorded a single, "Pretty Girls Everywhere", and became a leading attraction at Gazzari's Club in Hollywood.  They also appeared on the Shindig! TV show, developed by Jack Good, and then on a weekly TV show, Ninth Street A Go Go.

Late in 1964, they met drummer Gary Leeds, previously of The Standells (Late 1962–1964). He had recently toured the UK with singer P.J. Proby.  Leeds – along with club regular Brian Jones – persuaded them that the band's rock and roll and blues style would go down well in "swinging London," where Proby had already succeeded.  Before leaving, they recorded their second single, "Love Her," overseen by Nick Venet and arranger Jack Nitzsche, with Scott Engel taking the lead vocal part for the first time—previously John Walker had been the lead vocalist. With his distinct baritone, Scott became the group's de facto frontman, and the trio shifted their focus from upbeat R&B to pop ballads that better suited his vocals. They also appeared in a film, Beach Ball, and sent demo recordings to record labels in the United Kingdom.

With financial backing from Leeds' stepfather, Walker, Engel and Leeds traveled to the UK in February 1965 for an exploratory visit.

Success in the UK

When they landed in England, record producer Johnny Franz was keen to sign them up. In a short time, Walker and Engel had secured a recording contract with Philips Records, an affiliate of Mercury, and had played several venues around the UK, with Leeds as drummer. Along with the group's relocation came a change in image, abandoning matching suits and pompadours in favor of the mop top haircuts and casual attire typical of British pop stars. Their first single, "Pretty Girls Everywhere," had little success, but radio stations picked up on the follow-up "Love Her" with Engel's baritone vocals, and it made the Top 20 in the UK Singles Chart in June 1965. The song had originally been recorded by The Everly Brothers and released as the B-side to their single "The Girl Who Sang The Blues" in 1963.

Philips then recorded and released the group's version of "Make It Easy on Yourself," a Burt Bacharach and Hal David ballad previously recorded by Jerry Butler. It was sung by Engel (by now called Scott Walker), arranged by Ivor Raymonde and produced by Johnny Franz, with a full orchestra augmented by session musicians. Session musicians on the record included Alan Parker and Big Jim Sullivan.
By August 1965, "Make It Easy on Yourself" had entered the UK Top 10, eventually reaching the top of the record chart. Later in the year, it also reached No. 16 in the US Billboard Hot 100. The track sold 250,000 copies in the UK, and over one million copies globally, achieving gold disc status.

The number 3 UK hit "My Ship Is Coming In", originally recorded in 1965 by soul singer Jimmy Radcliffe, followed. Then in March 1966, The Walker Brothers hit No. 1 for the second time in six months with "The Sun Ain't Gonna Shine Anymore." Their popularity in the UK – particularly that of Scott – reached a new high, especially among teenage girls, and their fan club in that country was said to have been larger than The Beatles.' "The Sun Ain't Gonna Shine Anymore" also made the US Top 20, but had less success in the US.

The Walker Brothers continued to have chart hits in the UK in 1966 and 1967, with Scott taking a more prominent role in their song choices and arrangements, but with diminishing commercial success. They also had to leave the UK for six months in 1967 because of work permit problems. As pop music moved on, the Walker Brothers began to sound dated. By the end of 1967, the pressures of stardom, internal tensions and 'artistic differences' began to weaken the group. After a UK tour in April 1967, which also featured Jimi Hendrix, Cat Stevens, and Engelbert Humperdinck, followed by a tour of Japan in 1968, the group officially disbanded.

Reunion in the 1970s
All three continued to release solo records, with Scott (who first recorded solo in 1967) being by far the most successful and creating a large cult following.  Late in 1974, Walker, Engel and Leeds agreed to reform The Walker Brothers. In 1975, they released the album No Regrets.  The title track was released as a single and rose to No. 7 on the UK chart in early 1976.  They recorded two further albums together, Lines (1976) and Nite Flights (1978), which were less commercially successful; the experimental style of Scott's tracks on Nite Flights laid the stylistic groundwork for his later solo career.  The Walker Brothers undertook some cabaret performances, although Engel (by now more usually known as Scott Walker) was reluctant to sing live; the group's contract with GTO Records ended and, according to John Walker, the group "just drifted apart."

Later activities
Interest in the band was briefly revived in 1992 with the issue of the compilation album No Regrets – The Best of Scott Walker and The Walker Brothers 1965–1976, which reached No. 4 in the UK Albums Chart.

John Walker later went on to customise guitars and establish his own recording studio in California, and resumed touring in 2004. Gary Walker remains active in England. Scott Walker continued to record sporadically and engage in cultural works, e.g. curating the Meltdown festival. John and Gary Walker published their own joint autobiography, The Walker Brothers: No Regrets—Our Story, in 2009. John died at his Los Angeles home on May 7, 2011; Scott died in London on 22 March 2019, leaving Gary as the last surviving Walker brother.

"The Sun Ain't Gonna Shine Anymore" and "Stay With Me Baby" were prominently featured in the 2012 film, Seeking a Friend for the End of the World, written and directed by Lorene Scafaria and starring Steve Carell and Keira Knightley.

Scott Walker: 30 Century Man is a 2006 documentary film about Scott Walker by Stephen Kijak. The film got its title from the song "30 Century Man." It charted Walker's career in music, with a focus on his songwriting, and featured footage of recording sessions for his album, The Drift. It included a sequence in which Walker oversaw the recording of the punching of a joint of pork, for the percussion on the song "Clara". David Bowie acted as the executive producer of the film.

Band members
 Scott Walker – lead vocals, guitar, bass guitar, keyboards
 Gary Walker – drums, vocals
 John Walker – guitar, vocals

Discography

 Take It Easy with the Walker Brothers (1965)
 Introducing The Walker Brothers (1965) (1st US album)
 Portrait (1966)
 The Sun Ain't Gonna Shine Anymore (1966) (2nd US album)
 Images (1967)
 No Regrets (1975)
 Lines (1976)
 Nite Flights (1978)

See also
List of performers on Top of the Pops
List of artists who reached number one on the UK Singles Chart
UK No.1 Hits of 1965
UK No.1 Hits of 1966
Philips Records
List of number-one singles from the 1960s (UK)
British Invasion

References

External links
Further information
 Scott Walker fanpage and Walker Brothers message board – Germany
Photo archive of Scott Walker and The Walker Brothers by photographer Chris Walter
John Walker's website
 
 
Entry at 45cat.com

1964 establishments in California
1978 disestablishments in California
American expatriates in the United Kingdom
Rock music groups from California
Musical groups from Los Angeles
American pop music groups
Philips Records artists
Smash Records artists
Musical groups established in 1964
Musical groups disestablished in 1978
Scott Walker (singer)